Carlos Helario Mejia (born 1894, date of death unknown) was a Mexican equestrian. He competed in two events at the 1932 Summer Olympics.

References

1894 births
Year of death missing
Mexican male equestrians
Olympic equestrians of Mexico
Equestrians at the 1932 Summer Olympics
Sportspeople from Mexico City